The 2012 Campeonato Argentino de Rugby was the 66th version of the annual rugby competition held in Argentina in 2012. It was played between 3 March and 28 April of that year.  The winner was Cordobesa, who defeated Rosario in the final game.

The Campeonato Argentino consisted of 28 teams, divided into three divisions, "Campeonato", "Ascenso" and "Estimulo", based on the records of the individual teams.  For the first time since 1950, national teams from outside Argentina were admitted into the competition, with teams from Uruguay and Chile being admitted to the Campeonato division, and Brasil and Paraguay admitted to the Estimulo division.

"Campeonato"

Preliminary 

The preliminary round consisted of ten teams divided in two pools of five teams each.  The top three of each pool made it to the final pool.  The final six teams then played in a round robin tournament, from which the top two teams played for the championship.

 Pool 1

 Pool 2

Round robin 

First phase results.  Winners in bold.

Second phase results.  Winners in bold.

Championship game

Second Division:  Zona Ascenso 

Eight teams divided in two pools. The two teams which finished top in their pool play in the semifinal, where the top team from Pool 3 plays the second team from Pool 4, and the top team from Pool 4 plays the second team from Pool 3.  The winners of those two games are then put into a pool with the two teams which finished last in the Campeonato division.  The two teams which finish first in that final pool will be in the Campeonato division the next year, while the two teams which finish last in that pool will be relegated to the Ascenso Division.  Finally, the team which finishes last in Pool 4 plays the team which finishes last in Pool 3, with the loser being demoted the following year to Estimulo division.

Pool 3

Pool 4

Playout 

 Noreste demoted to Estimulo division

Semifinals

Final pool

Torneo "Estimulo" 
"URBA Desarollo" (a development team from Buenos Aires replaced Brazil.  Ten teams total, split into two pools of five teams each.  The top team from each pool play each other, with the winner moving up into the Ascenco Division the following year.

Pool 5 

 Misiones advanced to the final game.

Pool 6 

 Oeste advanced to the final game.

Final 

 Oeste was promoted to the Ascenso Division

External Links and Bibliography 
  Memorias de la UAR 2011
  Francesco Volpe, Paolo Pacitti (Author), Rugby 2012, GTE Gruppo Editorale (2011)
  Torneo Argentino 2012:Zona Campeonato on rugbyfun.com.ar
  Torneo Argentino 2012:Zona Ascenso on rugbyfun.com.ar
 Torneo estimulo 2012

Campeonato Argentino de Rugby
Argentina
Campeonato